Pingboard is software program designed to create real-time organizational charts. It synchronizes organizational charts with HRMS software automatically, replacing the need to make org charts manually. Org charts can be shared with specific people, kept private or accessed by all employees via a native mobile org chart app. Employee information can be updated by the employees themselves or by administrators.

Company overview 

Headquartered in Austin, Texas, Pingboard is a privately held company created by a team of engineers. The company emerged from Capital Thought, a venture by serial entrepreneurs Joshua Baer, Jason Cohen, and Bill Boebel. Pingboard raised $2.2 million in seed funding from Silverton Partners. Pingboard was designed to help companies organize their employees and departments, develop hiring and succession plans, and share this information on the corporate org chart.

Company history 

Pingboard was founded in 2013 by Bill Boebel and Rob Eanes, and has grown to 32 employees. Boebel, who was the director of the Austin, TX based incubator Capital Factory, originally developed the software to manage member's internal information. Boebel previously founded Webmail.us, a Virginia-based company acquired in 2007 by San-Antonio-based Rackspace (NYSE: RAX).

References

External links 
 

Companies based in Austin, Texas
American companies established in 2013
Privately held companies based in Texas
Software companies of the United States
2013 establishments in the United States
2013 establishments in Texas
Software companies established in 2013
Companies established in 2013